Junior MasterChef is a British TV cookery competition, broadcast by the BBC, in which nine to twelve-year-olds compete to be crowned "Junior MasterChef". It is a spin-off from the main UK series of MasterChef.

Junior MasterChef first ran from 1994 to 1999, presented by Loyd Grossman. After a long hiatus, it was revived in 2010 in a revamped format, presented by writer and actress Nadia Sawalha, who won the 2007 series of Celebrity MasterChef, and professional chef John Torode, who also presents MasterChef. The revival series was commissioned by CBBC controller Anne Gilchrist and produced by Shine Television, and was broadcast on CBBC and BBC One. A further series was commissioned in 2012 for broadcast on CBBC and again in 2014.

Original series
Based on the MasterChef format, and using the same set, the original Junior MasterChef was for cooks up to the age of 16. It ran from 1994 to 1999 and was presented by Loyd Grossman.

Revival series
Junior MasterChef was briefly revived in 2008 for a Children in Need special after the success of the 2006 series. It was won by Billy.

The first new series, for children aged 9 to 12, began on 10 May 2010 on CBBC. India Fisher provided the voiceover as usual, while the judges were John Torode and former  Junior MasterChef champion, Lawrence Julian Roberts. 

Georgia, who had become 13 yrs old by the time the finals occurred, was the 2010 winner. From the 2012 series, Sawalha was replaced by Irish cook Donal Skehan.

Age limit rules
The online application form for the CBBC series filmed in 2012 clearly shows that applicants had to be between 8 and 13 years old on 6 August of that year. Filming of the early heats would start on that same date.

Winners

Transmissions

See also
 MasterChef

References

External links

BBC children's television shows
Endemol Shine Group franchises
Junior
MasterChef Junior
1994 British television series debuts
2014 British television series endings
1990s British cooking television series
2010s British cooking television series
English-language television shows
Reality television spin-offs
British television series revived after cancellation
Cooking competitions in the United Kingdom
Television series about children
Television series about teenagers